Aberdeen F.C. competed in the Scottish Premier Division, Scottish Cup, Scottish League Cup and UEFA Cup in the 1989–90 season.

Overview

In October 1989, Aberdeen reached the Scottish League Cup final for the third successive season and faced Rangers for the third successive year. Aberdeen won 2–1 thanks to two goals from Englishman Paul Mason and a superb display from Dutch goalkeeper Theo Snelders.

November saw a new signing from PSV Eindhoven, striker Hans Gillhaus, join for a record transfer fee of £650,000. The Dutchman made an immediate impact by scoring twice on his debut against Dunfermline Athletic. In May 1990, Aberdeen won the Scottish Cup for the seventh time after a penalty shoot-out victory over Celtic following a 0–0 draw.

Two Aberdeen players won player-of-the-year awards: Alex McLeish won the Scottish Football Writers' Player of the Year award and Jim Bett was voted Scottish Professional Footballers' Association Players' Player of the Year.

Results

Scottish Premier Division

Final standings

Scottish League Cup

Scottish Cup

UEFA Cup

Squad

Appearances & Goals

|}

References

AFC Heritage Trust

Aberdeen F.C. seasons
Aberdeen